The discography of The Enright House, a post-rock band based in Christchurch, New Zealand, consists of one studio album, one compilation album, five extended plays, one single and four music videos.

Studio albums

Compilation albums

Extended plays

Split EPs

Singles

Other charted songs

The following are songs by The Enright House that have charted, but were not released as a single.

Music videos

References

External links
TheEnrightHouse.com – Official website of The Enright House
A Low Hum: The Enright House
The Enright House at Discogs
[ The Enright House] at Allmusic

Discographies of New Zealand artists
Pop music group discographies
Rock music group discographies